Beiguozhuang (Simplified Chinese: 北郭庄 or 邢台; pinyin: Beiguozhuang) is a village in the northeast of Xingtai.

Populated places in Hebei
Villages in China
Xingtai